The Tourist Landmark of the Resistance, also known as Museum for Resistance Tourism, is a war museum operated by Hezbollah near the village of Mleeta in southern Lebanon. The museum opened on May 25, 2010, marking  the 10th anniversary of the Israeli withdrawal from southern Lebanon in 2000. The site was once an important base for Hezbollah fighters.

History
Opened in May 2010, the inauguration of the museum was attended by representatives of the president and prime minister of Lebanon, and Noam Chomsky.

Over 130,000 people visited the museum within its first ten days of being open. According to museum officials, within the first three months, the museum had nearly 300,000 visitors, including many from Egypt and the Persian Gulf, Lebanon, and other foreigners. As of 2017, the museum had over 1.6 million visitors.

The museum
 
Tours are led by guides who begin by welcoming tourists. The guides emphasize the view of Hezbollah being the sole defenders of Lebanon against Israel, and mainly responsible for the Israeli withdrawal that came eighteen years after Israel's second invasion of Lebanon in 1982. They also say that Hezbollah's involvement is defensive: "If the Israelis don't attack us, we won't attack them. We are not terrorists, we are very peaceful people and we have the right to live like any other nations."

In his welcome speech on video, Hezbollah leader Hassan Nasrallah tells visitors that "We hope this tourist jihadi center will be a first step toward preserving the history of our heroic resistance." 
Visitors are then shown a film about the Lebanese-Israeli conflict that ends with a speech by Nasrallah and a "sober pronouncement" by the assassinated Hezbollah leader Abbas al-Musawi that "Israel has fallen". They are then led past a large pit filled with Israeli helmets, tanks and shell casings. A sign reads, "This is a structural scenic art that symbolizes the defeat of Zionist entity."

Other park features include large portraits of Nasrallah and al-Musawi, and of Iranian leaders ayatollahs Ruhollah Khomeini and Ali Khamenei. There are also wall panels with details of Israel's military machine, and a map showing places in Israel such as the Negev Nuclear Research Center near Dimona. Visitors can walk along a 100-meter-long sunken pathway cut into the rock leading to a lookout once used by Hezbollah fighters.  Children can play at pretending to aim anti-aircraft guns by raising and lowering them, or clamber on overturned armoured personnel carriers.

Among the attractions is a Hezbollah bunker and a tunnel 200 meters long. This was in use during the 2006 war. The bunker contains cots, kitchenware, electrical generators, and other equipment including an office equipped with telephones, radios and computers offering visitors a view into the life of Hezbollah fighters.

The park features a garden decorated with guns and missiles, called Martyrs Hill, and stone steps climb up to an esplanade dedicated to the organization's martyrs who have died as shahid fighting against Israel. Half a million people are estimated to have visited the theme park in the first 10 weeks after it opened.

Plans
Hezbollah has plans to expand the park's visitor facilities with swimming pools, spas, playgrounds, hotels and camping areas so that people "can come here and spend their vacations", stating that people in southern Lebanon have been deprived of such recreation for decades.  There are also plans for a cable car to connect the park and town of Mleeta with the nearby town of Sojod.

See also
 Hezbollah Ideology
 Hezbollah foreign relations
 South Lebanon conflict (1982–2000)

References

External links

Official website: "The Land Speaks to Heavens"
Video of Museum for Resistance Tourism 

Museums in Lebanon
Museums established in 2010
Hezbollah
Military of Lebanon
History of Lebanon
2010 establishments in Lebanon
Military and war museums
Articles containing video clips